The St. Louis Rams were a professional American football team of the National Football League (NFL). They played in St. Louis from 1995 to the 2015 season, before moving back to Los Angeles, where the team had played from 1946 to 1994.

The arrival of the Rams, which originated in Cleveland before moving to Los Angeles in 1946, gave St. Louis a professional football team for the first time since the St. Louis Cardinals left for Arizona in 1987.

The Rams played their home games at what is now known as The Dome at America's Center in downtown St. Louis, which the city had been building for a few years in the hopes of gaining an NFL team. Dubbed the Trans World Dome, the stadium was unready when the team arrived, so it temporarily shared Busch Memorial Stadium with the St. Louis Cardinals of Major League Baseball (MLB). The Rams played their first game in St. Louis on September 10, 1995, defeating the New Orleans Saints, 17–13. The Trans World Dome opened on November 12, 1995, when the Rams defeated the Carolina Panthers 28–17.

The franchise notched its first winning season and playoff appearance as a St. Louis team in 1999, and went on to win its first and only championship in Super Bowl XXXIV. That season began a four-year run of success with The Greatest Show on Turf offense, which included a franchise-best 14–2 record in 2001 en route to a Super Bowl XXXVI appearance.

But the Rams struggled throughout their remaining years in St. Louis. By the time they moved back to Los Angeles, the Rams had gone 12 seasons without a winning record and 11 seasons without qualifying for the postseason.

The Rams played their last game in St. Louis on December 17, 2015, defeating the Tampa Bay Buccaneers 31–23 in a home stadium that had been renamed the Edward Jones Dome. Their last game as a St. Louis-based franchise was on January 3, 2016, against the San Francisco 49ers at Levi's Stadium, which they lost 19–16. After the 2015 NFL season, the team returned to Los Angeles.

Origins

Cardinals move to Arizona and begin new approach

For 22 of their 28 years, the St. Louis Cardinals called Busch Memorial Stadium home when it opened in 1966, after spending their first six seasons in St. Louis at Sportsman's Park; they shared both venues with the baseball team of the same name. The overall mediocrity of the football Cardinals, combined with stadium problems, caused attendance to dwindle. Consequently, the Bidwill family, who had moved the Cardinals from Chicago in 1960, decided to move it a second time. The cities the Bidwills considered included Baltimore, Phoenix, New York City, and Jacksonville, while Columbus and Oakland made overtures without Bidwell considering them. Nonetheless, Cardinals fans were unhappy at losing their team, and Bill Bidwill, fearing for his safety, stayed away from several of the 1987 home games. The Cardinals’ final home game in St. Louis was on December 13, 1987, a 27–24 win over the New York Giants in front of 29,623 fans on a late Sunday afternoon.

Not long after the 1987 season, Bidwill agreed to move to the Phoenix area on a handshake deal with state and local officials, and the team became the Phoenix Cardinals. They planned to play at Arizona State University’s Sun Devil Stadium in Tempe on a temporary basis while a new stadium was being built. Unfortunately for the Cardinals, the savings and loan crisis derailed financing for the stadium, forcing the Cardinals to play at Arizona State for 18 years. The team changed its name to the Arizona Cardinals for the 1994 season.

The move to Anaheim 
Before the Rams’ 1979 Super Bowl season, the team's owner Carroll Rosenbloom drowned in an accident. His widow, Georgia Frontiere, inherited 70% ownership of the team. Frontiere fired her stepson, Steve Rosenbloom, and assumed total control of the franchise. As had been planned before Carroll Rosenbloom's death, the Rams moved from their longtime home at the Los Angeles Memorial Coliseum to Anaheim Stadium in nearby Orange County in 1980. The move was necessitated in part because the Coliseum's abnormally large seating capacity of 100,000 was difficult to sell out, which often subjected the team to the league's local-market TV blackout rule. At the same time, Southern California's population patterns were changing; there was rapid growth in L.A.’s affluent suburbs (e.g. greater Orange County) and a decline in the city of Los Angeles’s population and income. Anaheim Stadium was originally built in 1966 as the home of the California Angels Major League Baseball franchise. To accommodate the Rams’ move, the ballpark was reconfigured with luxury suites and enclosed to accommodate crowds of about 65,000 for football.

From 1982, the Coliseum was also occupied by the Los Angeles Raiders. The combined effect of these two factors split the loyalties of the Rams’ traditional fan base between two teams. Making matters even worse, the Rams were unsuccessful on the field, while the Raiders were thriving, winning Super Bowl XVIII in 1983. The Los Angeles Lakers won the NBA Finals in 1980, their first of five titles in that decade; the Los Angeles Dodgers won the World Series in 1981 and 1988; and the Los Angeles Kings, buoyed by the acquisition of Wayne Gretzky in August 1988, advanced to the 1993 Stanley Cup Finals.

1990–94: Frontiere’s endgame for the L.A. Rams
Although it was not apparent at the time, the Rams’ loss in the 1989 NFC Championship Game marked the end of an era. The Rams did not have another winning season in Los Angeles before their relocation. The first half of the 1990s featured four straight 10-loss (or worse) seasons, no playoff appearances and waning fan interest. The return of Chuck Knox as head coach after successful stints as head coach of the Buffalo Bills and the Seattle Seahawks did not boost the Rams’ fortunes. Knox's run-oriented offense brought about the end of offensive coordinator Ernie Zampese’s tenure in 1993. General manager John Shaw was perceived by some to continually squander NFL draft picks on sub-standard talent. The offensive scheme was not only unspectacular to watch, but dull by 1990s standards, further alienating fans. One bright spot for the offense during this time was be running back Jerome Bettis, a bruising running back from Notre Dame. Bettis flourished in Knox’s offense, running for 1,429 yards as a rookie and 1,025 in his sophomore effort.

As early as the close of the 1992 season, Georgia Frontiere announced she wanted to break the Rams’ lease at Anaheim Stadium. After the 1993 season, Frontiere attempted to move the Rams to Baltimore, but her fellow owners turned that proposal down. Frontiere then sought to relocate the team to St. Louis, but was voted down again, with 21 opposed, 3 in favor (the Rams, Cincinnati Bengals and Tampa Bay Buccaneers), and 6 abstaining. The other owners (led by Buffalo's Ralph Wilson, the Jets’ Leon Hess, the Giants’ Wellington Mara, Washington's Jack Kent Cooke, Arizona's Bill Bidwill and Minnesota's John Skoglund) believed that the Rams’ financial problems were caused by the Frontieres’ mismanagement. When Frontiere threatened to sue the league, commissioner Paul Tagliabue acquiesced to Frontiere's demands. As part of the relocation deal, the city of St. Louis agreed to build a taxpayer-financed stadium, the Trans World Dome, and guaranteed that the stadium's amenities would be maintained in the top 25% of all NFL stadiums. Frontiere waived the clause after a 10-year threshold period passed, as the city implemented a later plan to improve the stadium.

The move left many in the Los Angeles area embittered toward the NFL. That sentiment was best expressed by actor and ex-Ram Fred Dryer, who at the time said “I hate these people [the organization and its owner] for what they did, taking the Rams logo with them when they moved to St. Louis. That logo belonged to Southern California.” Steve Rosenbloom, general manager of the team during his father's tenure as owner, opined that teams come and go, but for a team to leave Los Angeles — the second largest city in America — for St. Louis (approximately the 18th-largest) was simply irresponsible and foolish, despite the notoriously fickle support of Los Angeles fans. With the Raiders moving from L.A. back to Oakland only a few months later, the NFL would have no franchise in Los Angeles for two decades, with the Coliseum was used for professional football only in 2001, by the Los Angeles Xtreme of the now-defunct XFL.

First years (1995–1998)
While the Rams dealt with stadium concerns in Los Angeles, efforts were under way to regain an NFL franchise in St. Louis to play in a new domed stadium slated to open in 1995. First, Anheuser-Busch scion Jim Orthwein tried, and failed, to move the New England Patriots to St. Louis. Then, despite being heavily favored along with Charlotte to win an expansion team, St. Louis lost to a group from Jacksonville, Florida. So certain, in fact, did it appear that St. Louis would gain an expansion franchise, that the team had a name selected – the Stallions – and T-shirts with the team's logo were made very briefly available for sale at a number of area sports shops.

Just before moving to St. Louis, the Rams fired Knox and hired Rich Brooks, longtime successful coach at the University of Oregon, to replace him. The team played its first several games in St. Louis at Busch Stadium, the home of the NFL's St. Louis Cardinals from 1966 until 1987, as work finished on their new home, the Trans World Dome. Brooks jettisoned Knox's run-oriented scheme in favor of a powerful air attack. Bettis all but disappeared from the offense, rushing for only 637 yards. Despite this, the Rams started off well, getting off to a 5–1 start, until a 44–10 loss to the 49ers in the last game at Busch Stadium sent the team into a downward spiral, and they finished 7–9 — still the franchise's closest to contention since 1989. Perhaps the most memorable aspect was that veteran offensive lineman and future Hall of Famer Jackie Slater played his 20th and final season with the team in its new St. Louis location.

Vermeil era

The next three seasons were largely a repeat of the Rams’ final five seasons in Los Angeles. The team drafted highly touted Nebraska running back Lawrence Phillips with the sixth overall pick in the 1996 NFL Draft. Now expendable, Bettis was traded to the Pittsburgh Steelers in exchange for draft picks, a move now seen as one of the most lopsided trades in professional sports history, strongly favoring the Steelers. After regressing to 6–10 in 1996, Brooks was replaced by Dick Vermeil. Vermeil had enjoyed success as the head coach of UCLA, where he won a Rose Bowl, and the Philadelphia Eagles, who he led to Super Bowl XV. However, he had left the Eagles after an unsuccessful 1982 season, claiming burnout, and spent much of the next decade and a half as a college football commentator for ABC Sports.

Vermeil's first two seasons as Rams coach were as unsuccessful as many of the preceding seasons. Phillips was cut from the team mid-season in 1997 after showing up for a game with alcohol on his breath, cementing his status as a draft bust.

At the close of the 1998 season, the franchise's combined record over nine seasons was 45–99, the worst in the NFL for the period and rivalled by only the Cincinnati Bengals, who went 49–97 over the same span.

1999–2001: The Greatest Show on Turf

1999: Super Bowl champions

Finally, in 1999, there appeared to be reason for hope. The Rams obtained running back Marshall Faulk from Indianapolis in a trade. The Rams also signed former-Redskin quarterback Trent Green as a free agent in February 1999 to a 4-year $17.5 million contract that included a $4.5 million signing bonus. Additionally, the Rams drafted wide receiver Torry Holt with the sixth overall pick in the 1999 NFL Draft.

However, in a preseason game against the San Diego Chargers, Green blew out his anterior cruciate ligament and missed the entire season, prompting Green's backup, a 28-year-old former Arena Football League Iowa Barnstormers and NFL Europe Amsterdam Admirals player named Kurt Warner, to enter the game. During postgame press conferences, a tearful Vermeil vowed that the Rams would "rally around" Warner and “play good football” with him. Most observers believed Green's injury set up the Rams for another long season of failure; in fact, ESPN Magazine predicted that the Rams would finish with the worst record in the league (even below that of the recently reactivated Cleveland Browns).

However, Warner would have one of the most explosive starts to a career in football history, throwing for over 4000 yards and 41 touchdowns. His quarterback rating of 109.2 was the highest in the NFL that year. He proved to be the catalyst that sparked an explosive offense nicknamed “The Greatest Show on Turf”, which would lead the NFL in points. Warner captured the NFL MVP award at season's end, while the 1999 NFL Offensive Player of the Year Award went to Faulk.

The Rams were also noted for a colorful celebration conducted by their offensive players in the end zone after scoring a touchdown. The celebration, which involved a group of players standing in a circle and swaying their arms as a football spun like a top in the center of the circle, was known as the “Bob 'N Weave.” This type of “premeditated and prolonged” display was shortly thereafter subject to “excessive celebration” penalties installed by the league.

After finishing the 1999 season 13–3 (the franchise's second-best regular season record to date), the Rams started out the playoffs by defeating the Minnesota Vikings 49–37 to achieve their first NFC championship game since 1989. Their opponent was the Tampa Bay Buccaneers, who proved successful in shutting down the Rams’ vaunted offense. Still, the Rams managed to win the game 11–6, with the one touchdown coming on Warner's 30-yard touchdown pass to Ricky Proehl, who made an amazing one-handed catch. Proehl, a 10-year NFL veteran who was in the playoffs for the first time in his NFL career, said after the game “There are a lot of people who say there are 500 Ricky Proehls out there. I beg to differ.”

The Rams’ opponent in Super Bowl XXXIV was the Tennessee Titans, who, like the Rams, had recently relocated cities. In a game that many consider the best Super Bowl ever, Tennessee played the Rams tough throughout, achieving a 16–16 tie with 2:12 left on an Al Del Greco field goal. On the next drive, Warner, who had been a clutch performer all season long, came through once again, connecting with Isaac Bruce for a 73-yard touchdown pass on the first play of the drive to give the Rams a 23–16 lead with 1:53 to play.

Tennessee then mounted a desperate, last-minute drive, reaching the St. Louis 10-yard line with six seconds left and no timeouts. Titans quarterback Steve McNair threw to Kevin Dyson on a slant. Dyson caught the pass at the 3-yard line but was stopped in a play known as “The Tackle”; Rams linebacker Mike Jones brought Dyson down just 18 inches shy of the goal line, ending the game and giving the Rams and coach Dick Vermeil their first Super Bowl victory. Warner was named Super Bowl MVP.

Following the Rams’ Super Bowl victory, Vermeil retired from football (though he came back in 2001 as head coach of the Kansas City Chiefs) and was replaced by offensive coordinator (and apprentice) Mike Martz.

2000: Wild card loss

In Mike Martz’ first year as Rams head coach, the defending-champion Rams started the season by winning their first six games as they went 7–1 in the first half of the season. However, their season started getting ugly. They went 3–5 during the last half of the season, including a three-game losing streak. They still managed to get into the playoffs with a 10–6 record and the NFC's #6 seed, and faced the NFC West champion New Orleans Saints, the #3 seed, in the Wild Card round. Playing at the Louisiana Superdome, the Rams’ 24th-ranked defense yielded New Orleans a 31–7 lead, but the Rams valiantly fought back, scoring three straight touchdowns. However, the comeback fell short as the Saints triumphed 31–28, the first playoff win in New Orleans franchise history.

2001: Third Super Bowl and loss to the Patriots

In 2001, the “Max Q” Rams went 14–2 (including a spectacular 8–0 on the road), led not only by a sensational offense (their third straight year of scoring 500 or more points), but a good defense as well, coached by Lovie Smith and led by Adam Archuleta. After handling the Green Bay Packers in the divisional playoffs, the Rams fought off the Philadelphia Eagles in the NFC Championship Game 29–24 to reach their second Super Bowl in three seasons. Their opponents in Super Bowl XXXVI would be the New England Patriots who, much as the Rams had had two years previous, had enjoyed a Cinderella playoff run, highlighted by a dramatic and controversial 16–13 divisional playoff win against the Oakland Raiders.

The talent-laden Rams appeared to be primed to become the first professional football dynasty of the 21st century. It was however, the Patriots who began their dynasty that night. They went on to win three Super Bowls in a four-year span, and have played in nine since the 2001 season as of 2020. Despite being a 14-point favorite, the Rams were dominated by the Patriots for most of the game. The Patriots chipped the Rams wideouts and running backs, disrupting their precision passing patterns. They also beat up Kurt Warner, forcing him into uncharacteristic mistakes, including a 47-yard touchdown interception return by Ty Law.

In the fourth quarter, the Rams mounted a comeback attempt. Two plays after an apparent game-clinching 95-yard fumble return by the Patriots was reversed on a penalty, Kurt Warner scored on a two-yard keeper to bring the Rams to within seven points, 17–10. After holding the Patriots on the next drive, the Rams were in much the same situation as they had been against Tennessee. Warner came through once again, quickly leading the Rams on a dramatic drive culminating in a 26-yard touchdown pass to Ricky Proehl. The extra point by Jeff Wilkins tied the game at 17 with 90 seconds left.

With the Patriots holding no timeouts and the Rams having seized the momentum, overtime seemed assured. Fox Sports commentator John Madden opined that the Patriots should run out the clock to end regulation time. Nevertheless, quarterback Tom Brady led the Patriots down the field, completing all but one pass (an intentional spike to stop the clock) before Adam Vinatieri’s last-second 48-yard field goal defeated the Rams 20–17.

Super Bowl XXXVI later became part of the wider 2007 National Football League videotaping controversy, also known as “Spygate". The Boston Herald reported, citing an unnamed source, that the Patriots had taped the Rams’ walkthrough practice prior to the game. After further investigation, the league determined that no tape of the Rams’ Super Bowl walkthrough was made, and the Herald later issued an apology in 2008 for the article.

2002–2014: Struggles

In 2002, the Rams had a very disappointing 7–9 final record (after starting out 0–5). The silver lining was the emergence of young quarterback Marc Bulger, from West Virginia University, who, after Kurt Warner was injured, won every game in which he both started and finished. Bulger's emergence was a highlight of the Rams’ 2002 NFL season, demonstrating Martz's knack for developing lightly regarded or overlooked players into top-quality, productive quarterbacks. The Rams also gained two new divisional rivals in the NFC West thanks to a league-wide realignment that created eight new divisions of four teams each. One of these new rivals, the Arizona Cardinals, played in St. Louis from 1960 until the end of the 1987 season, and the other, the Seattle Seahawks, returned to the NFC for the first time since their inaugural 1976 season.

In 2003, Warner lost the starting job to Bulger after suffering six fumbles in the season opener against the New York Giants. Warner was released by the Rams in June 2004 and quickly signed a free agent contract with the Giants, effectively ending the “Greatest Show on Turf” era.

The 2003 season saw the Rams go 12–4, winning the NFC West again. However, the Rams lost a crushing divisional-round defeat to the Carolina Panthers (29–23 in double overtime), who went on to become NFC champions.

During the 2004 NFL Draft, the Rams used their first pick (24th overall) to select running back Steven Jackson from Oregon State.

The Rams began their 10th year in St. Louis at home, winning their home opener over the Arizona Cardinals 17–10. They then lost the next two games: to the eventual NFC South champion Atlanta Falcons 34–17, and to the New Orleans Saints at home 28–25 in overtime. The Rams got to 2–2 start on the season with a 24–14 road victory over the San Francisco 49ers. In Week 5, they defeated the Seattle Seahawks 33–27 on the road, as Bulger connected with Shaun McDonald for the 52-yard winning score in overtime. Next came a home win over Tampa Bay, 28–21 before a road loss to the hapless Miami Dolphins, 31–14. Following a Week 8 bye, the Rams lost to the defending champion Patriots at home 40–22. The Rams then downed the Seahawks 23–12 but then lost their next games on the road, losing to the Buffalo Bills 37–17 and to the eventual NFC North champion Green Bay Packers 45–17. The team rebounded with a 16–6 home win over the 49ers, but their playoff hopes continued to shrink with two more road losses, falling to the Carolina Panthers 20–7 and to the Cardinals 31–7. At 6–8, the Rams rallied for home wins against the Philadelphia Eagles (20–7) and the New York Jets (32–29 in overtime), snatching the NFC's #5 seed despite finishing with an 8–8 record.

For the Wild Card round, the Rams faced the Seahawks for the third time. The visiting Rams took the lead on a 17-yard Bulger touchdown pass to Cam Cleeland with just 2:11 left in regulation time and then held off the Seahawks on 4th and goal to earn a 27–20 victory. The Rams made NFL history by becoming the first team to go .500 (8–8) in the regular season and then win a playoff game. However, St. Louis was thrashed in the divisional round by the Atlanta Falcons 47–17.

2005–2015: Playoff drought

During the 2005 NFL Draft, the Rams used their first pick on offensive tackle Alex Barron from Florida State. They lost on the road in Week 1 to the 49ers, 28–25, but rebounded with a 17–12 road win over Arizona and former Rams quarterback Kurt Warner. The Rams won their Week 3 home opener against the Titans 31–27 before dropping three straight games. In Week 5, Martz was diagnosed with an infection in his heart, and Joe Vitt was named interim head coach. In Vitt's first game at the helm, Bulger sprained an AC joint in a loss to Indianapolis. Replacement quarterback Jamie Martin then led the team to home victories against the Saints (28–17) and Jaguars (24–21). After a Week 9 bye, Bulger returned but the Rams fell in Seattle 31–16. The Rams next lost a rematch to the Cardinals, with Bulger suffering another shoulder injury. Against Houston, Martin was knocked out of the game with a concussion, giving rookie Ryan Fitzpatrick his first playing time in the NFL. Fitzpatrick would become a long-time journeyman playing for teams like the Bills, Jets, Buccaneers, and Dolphins. The Rams won 33–27 in overtime on a 56-yard touchdown strike from Fitzpatrick to receiver Kevin Curtis. However, they lost their next four games. Martin and the Rams managed to end their disastrous season on a positive note, beating Dallas on the road in ESPN’s final Sunday night game. Martz was fired at season’s end.

Despite having a talent-laden roster, the Rams’ front-office dysfunction had traveled from California to Missouri. With team president John Shaw remaining in Los Angeles after the relocation, president of football operations Jay Zygmunt clashed with head coach Martz, including an incident in which Zygmunt prevented the ill Martz from phoning in a play to his offensive coordinator. Poor draft choices and mediocre records began to pile up for the once-budding dynasty as the post-Martz era found the Rams in chaos. Hoping to regain control within the franchise, the Rams hired former Dolphins offensive coordinator Scott Linehan as head coach on January 19, 2006. On January 24, Jim Haslett, the former head coach of the Saints, signed a three-year deal as defensive coordinator.
 
Following the 2007 season, Georgia Frontiere died on January 18, 2008, after having owned the team for 28 years. Ownership of the team passed to her son Dale “Chip” Rosenbloom and daughter Lucia Rodriguez. Rosenbloom was named the new Rams majority owner. Linehan was fired on September 29, 2008, after the team started the 0–4, and Haslett took over as interim head coach for the rest of the season. In late December, Shaw and Zygmunt both resigned and Billy Devaney was promoted to general manager.

Steve Spagnuolo was named head coach in January 2009. Spagnuolo had masterminded the Giants’ defensive scheme that shut down the previously undefeated New England Patriots in Super Bowl XLII. As the 2009 season began, conservative talk show host Rush Limbaugh put in an offer to buy the Rams, but his controversial televised comments about Eagles quarterback Donovan McNabb in 2003 led the league to force Limbaugh to drop his plans. In spite of his success with the Giants, Spagnuolo's first season as Rams head coach was terribly disappointing as the team went 1–15, beginning with a shutout at the hands of the Seahawks. The team's lone victory came in Week 8 over the 2–14 Detroit Lions. However, Spagnuolo was not fired after his poor first season. From 2007 to 2009, the Rams lost 42 of 48 games.

2010: Stan Kroenke takes over
On May 31, 2009, the St. Louis Post-Dispatch reported that majority owners Rosenbloom and Rodriguez officially offered their majority share of Rams for sale. They retained the services of Goldman Sachs, a prominent investment banking firm, to help facilitate the sale of the Rams by evaluating bids and soliciting potential buyers. The sale price was unknown, but at the time Forbes estimated the team's value at $929 million. On the final day to do so, then-minority owner Stan Kroenke invoked his right of first refusal to buy the 60% of the team that he did not already own. The original intended buyer, Shahid Khan, would later acquire the Jaguars after the 2011 season. Pursuant to NFL rules, owners are prohibited from owning other sports teams in the same market. At the time of purchase, Kroenke, a real estate and sports mogul married to a Walmart heir (d/b/a Kroenke Sports Enterprises), owned the Denver Nuggets, the Colorado Avalanche, the Colorado Rapids, the Pepsi Center (home to the Nuggets and Avalanche) and Altitude Sports and Entertainment. These interests violated the NFL's cross-ownership rule. Nevertheless, on August 25, 2010, NFL owners unanimously approved Kroenke as the owner of the franchise contingent upon his eventual divestment of his Colorado sports interests. Kroenke complied with the rule when he transferred ownership of the Nuggets, the Avalanche, the Pepsi Center and the Altitude to his son Josh.

2010–14: Sam Bradford & Jeff Fisher

For having the NFL's worst record at 1–15 in 2009, the Rams earned the #1 overall pick in the 2010 NFL Draft and used it to acquire University of Oklahoma quarterback Sam Bradford.

Bradford was the main focus of the 2010 offseason. In order to make room for the new quarterback, Keith Null and several other unproductive players were cut from the roster. The Rams lost their season opener against the Cardinals with Bradford throwing three interceptions, including one on the last play of the game. They recorded their first win by beating Washington and ending a 14-game home-losing streak in Week 3. In Week 4, the Rams ended a 10-game losing streak against Seattle, 20–3. After being trounced 44–6 by Detroit, they returned home in Week 6 to beat San Diego 20–17. Bradford continued to show promise through the season despite struggling from his inexperience. Despite a 7–8 record, the Rams had a chance to win the NFC West when they traveled to 6–9 Seattle for a prime-time matchup. However, the Seahawks won the game and the division, 16–6. Bradford went on to win the 2010 Offensive Rookie of the Year award.

The 2011 season started disastrously, with the Rams opening 0–6, finally winning in an improbable victory over the Saints in Week 8. The team finished 2–14, with their only other win being a Week 10 victory over Cleveland. Bradford missed half the season with an ankle injury, and the Rams’ offense was rated the worst in the league.

At the conclusion of a poor 2011, Spagnuolo and nearly all of the coaching staff were fired except offensive coordinator Josh McDaniels, who was asked by the New England Patriots to return during the playoffs (he had been an assistant coach there prior to his disastrous stint as Denver Broncos head coach in 2009). The Rams then hired head coach Jeff Fisher, who had led the Tennessee Titans in their Super Bowl XXXIV loss to the Rams 12 years earlier. Fisher would then influence the hiring of new general manager Les Snead and an all-new coaching staff including offensive coordinator Brian Schottenheimer and defensive coordinator Gregg Williams. Williams was eventually suspended for the entire 2012 season for his part in the Saints bounty scandal.

Despite the 2011 fiasco, the Rams continued with their plans to rebuild the team around Bradford and convinced the Redskins to give up two first-round draft picks and one second-round draft pick in exchange for the Rams’ #2 overall pick. This moved the Rams down to the #6 pick in the 2012 NFL Draft, which they in turn traded to Dallas, but were left with an abundance of others for future use. Following the draft, they signed undrafted Oregon State punter Johnny Hekker, who would become a Pro Bowl-caliber player.

The Rams started 2012 with low hopes, but the draft trade with Washington confirmed Bradford would be their quarterback of the future. The team then surprised some by starting off 3–2, their first winning record since 2006. They then lost three straight, but rebounded with a solid 4–4–1 finish, including a 24–24 road tie with eventual NFC champion San Francisco, to finish 7–8–1, a five-game improvement over 2011 and an impressive 4–1–1 record in the very competitive NFC West.

In 2013, the Rams finished with a 7–9 record. In the 2014 season, their 20th in St. Louis, the team would again miss the playoffs with a 6–10 record. Bradford missed the entire 2014 season with an injury, allowing Shaun Hill and Austin Davis opportunities at quarterback.

2015: Nick Foles and the final season in St. Louis
On March 10, 2015, the Rams were involved in a rare trade of starting quarterbacks as they traded Bradford along with a fifth-round pick in 2015 to the Philadelphia Eagles in exchange for the Eagles' Nick Foles along with a fourth-round pick in 2015 and a second round pick in 2016. Foles had a 14–4 record as starter and an impressive TD–INT ratio of 46–17, while Bradford had an 18–30–1 record. On the day of the 2015 draft the Rams traded Zac Stacy, the Rams’ 2013 rushing leader, for a 7th round pick to the Jets.

The Rams opened their 2015 season at home against Seattle. In Foles’ Rams debut, he threw for 297 yards and a touchdown. Following the dramatic win, Foles struggled against his former divisional rival, the Redskins as the Rams lost 24–10. Foles' accuracy improved the following week but he threw no touchdowns and his first interception as a Ram against the Steelers, dropping the team to 1–2. Following the two losses Foles bounced back, handing the unbeaten Cardinals their first loss of the season. After that game, Foles’ problems with turnovers from 2014 started to show, as he completed 11 passes out of 30 for 141 yards, 1 touchdown, and a career-high 4 interceptions against the Green Bay Packers. On November 16, Foles was benched in favor of Case Keenum, who would start the remainder of the season.

Todd Gurley’s arrival and the beginning of Jared Goff
Leading the team through their turbulence was rookie running back Todd Gurley. Gurley was drafted 10th overall in the 2015 NFL Draft. Gurley, who tore his ACL in November 2014,  saw his rehabilitation go ahead of schedule and during the team's preseason, while he did not play, he practiced without pads on. Soon after, Gurley was medically cleared for full contact by St. Louis team physicians. On September 27, 2015, he made his NFL debut against the Pittsburgh Steelers. He was eased into action and finished the game with 6 rushes for 9 yards. The following week, the Rams visited undefeated Arizona for an NFC west divisional matchup. Again Gurley started slow with just 2 yards at halftime, but rushed for 144 yards in the second half as the Rams edged the Cardinals 24–22. The next three games against the Packers, Browns, and 49ers would see Gurley rush for at least 128 rushing yards per game. He scored his first NFL touchdown on October 25, 2015, against the Cleveland Browns. With 566 yards in his first four NFL starts, Gurley became the most prolific rusher in his first four NFL games since the AFL–NFL merger. In Week 15, Gurley became the third rookie in Rams history to rush for 1,000 yards in a season after Jerome Bettis and Eric Dickerson in the Rams 31–23 victory over the Buccaneers. and in their 23–17 victory over the Seattle Seahawks and becoming the second Rams rookie to rush for 1,000 yards and 10 touchdowns since Eric Dickerson in 1983.

The Rams played their final home game against the Tampa Bay Buccaneers, on December 17, 2015. While the Edward Jones Dome was not at sell out capacity, a sizeable group of Rams fans attended the game, holding signs that read “Keep the Rams in St. Louis.” Enthusiastic chants of “Keep the Rams” and “Kroenke Sucks” were heard during and after the game. Despite offensive production from Tampa Bay, the Rams still managed a 31–23 victory with Case Keenum throwing for 234 yards and 2 touchdowns, Todd Gurley rushing 48 yards, Tavon Austin rushing 32 yards and a touchdown, Kenny Britt receiving for 71 yards and 1 touchdown, and Jared Cook receiving for 64 yards. The Rams offense dominated this game as well the defense also put pressure on the Buccaneers quarterback Jameis Winston.

On December 22, 2015, Todd Gurley, along with fellow Rams players Aaron Donald and Johnny Hekker  were selected to be part of the 2016 Pro Bowl. Gurley was one of three rookies to be selected to the Pro Bowl, along with Chiefs cornerback Marcus Peters and Seahawks wide receiver and kick returner Tyler Lockett.
The Rams concluded their season with two road games in the West, winning 23–17 against the Seahawks and losing 19–16 in overtime against the 49ers. Overall, the team finished their final season in St. Louis with a 7–9 record.

Stadium problems; return relocation to Los Angeles

Stadium issues in St. Louis
The Rams and the St. Louis CVC began negotiating a deal to get the Rams’ home stadium, the Edward Jones Dome, into the top 25 percent of stadiums in the league (i.e., top eight of 32 NFL teams, in reference to luxury boxes, amenities and overall fan experience).  Under the terms of the lease agreement, the St. Louis CVC was required to make modifications to the Edward Jones Dome in 2005.  However, then-owner Georgia Frontiere waived this provision, in exchange for cash that served as a penalty for the city's noncompliance.  The City of St. Louis, in subsequent years, did make changes to the scoreboard and increased the natural lighting by replacing panels with windows, although the overall feel remained dark.  The minor renovations which totaled about $70 million did not bring the stadium within the specifications required under the lease agreement, thus keeping the Dome in a state of uncertainty.
On February 1, 2013, a three-panel arbitrator selected to preside over the arbitration process found that the Edward Jones Dome was not in the top 25 percent of all NFL venues, as required under the terms of the lease agreement between the Rams and the CVC.  The arbitrator further found that the estimated $700 million in proposed renovations by the Rams was not unreasonable, given the terms of the lease agreement.  Finally, the City of St. Louis was ordered to pay the Rams’ attorney fees which totaled a reported $2 million.

Publicly, no interest was expressed by city, county and state officials in providing further funding to the Edward Jones Dome, in light of those entities (and taxpayers) continuing to owe approximately $300 million on the facility.  A resolution was not reached by the end of the 2014 NFL season; therefore, with the City of St. Louis remaining in non-compliance with its obligations under the lease agreement, the Rams were free to nullify the lease and change to a year-to-year lease. Months later, the Rams scheduled a game to be played in London, violating the Edward Jones Dome's terms of lease.

National Car Rental Field proposal

In an effort to try to keep the team in St. Louis, a multipurpose stadium, National Car Rental Field, was proposed in 2015, estimated to cost $1.1 billion. The initial proposal called for the stadium to be paid for by a combination of $250 million from Rams, a $200 million loan from the NFL, $130 million from personal seat license sales, $55 million in tax credits and other public incentives, $350 million from extending the state bonds originally issued for the construction of the Edward Jones Dome.

On January 9, 2016, the NFL distributed a report to team owners calling the St. Louis stadium plan "unsatisfactory and inadequate" to keep the Rams in St. Louis.

Kroenke purchase of land for L.A. stadium

Commissioner Roger Goodell represented that Mr. Kroenke informed the league of the purchase. As an NFL owner, any purchase of land in which a potential stadium could be built must be disclosed to the league. Kroenke subsequently announced plans to build an NFL stadium on the site, in connection with the owners of the adjacent  Hollywood Park site, Stockbridge Capital Group. This development further fueled rumors that the Rams intended to return its management and football operations to Southern California. The land had been originally intended for a Walmart Supercenter, but Walmart could not get the necessary permits to build it. Kroenke is married to Ann Walton Kroenke, who is a member of the Walton family, and many of Kroenke's real estate deals have involved Walmart properties.

On January 5, 2015, the Los Angeles Times reported that Stan Kroenke and Stockbridge Capital Group were partnering up to develop a new NFL stadium on the Inglewood property owned by Kroenke. The stadium was projected to be ready by 2018. In lieu of this, St. Louis countered with a stadium plan for the north riverfront area of downtown, with the hope of keeping the Rams in the city.

On February 24, 2015, the Inglewood City Council approved the stadium plan and the initiative, and construction began on the new stadium on December 21, 2015, on the former Hollywood Park site.

Filing for relocation; Houston meetings
On January 4, 2016, the St. Louis Rams filed for relocation to move to the Los Angeles area for the 2016 NFL season. They were among three teams (the others being the Oakland Raiders and San Diego Chargers) that had filed for relocation to Los Angeles. All three franchises had previously played in the Los Angeles metropolitan area. Weeks later, the NFL owners gathered in Houston for a meeting on January 12 to decide which teams, if any, would win relocation rights to Los Angeles.

A few days before the scheduled owners meeting, Dallas Cowboys owner Jerry Jones suggested that the Rams and Chargers share Stan Kroenke's Los Angeles Entertainment Center. This suggestion was taken as a possible option discussed in the Houston meetings. During the Los Angeles meeting, the Committee on Los Angeles Opportunities, which consists of six NFL owners, favored the Carson project over the Rams’ Inglewood project. However, in the first round of voting, the Inglewood proposal got the greater number of votes (21) while the Carson project received far fewer (11). This, however, did not meet the required threshold of 24 votes. In the second round of voting, the Inglewood proposal got 20 votes while the Carson proposal got 12. After hours of trying to reach a compromise, the Rams succeeded and announced their relocation to Los Angeles, effectively ending the team's 21-year tenure in St. Louis.

The Chargers organization was given the first option to join the Rams after a year (if they failed to reach a new stadium deal with the city of San Diego); the Chargers exercised this option on January 12, 2017, making Los Angeles home to two NFL franchises again. (Had the Chargers declined to exercise this option, then the Raiders would have had this option.) The Raiders eventually relocated to Las Vegas, Nevada, after 25 years back in Oakland. The Rams were the second team to relocate to a previous home city (after the Raiders, who left Oakland after the 1981 season and moved back in time for the 1995 season).

Aftermath in St. Louis

St. Louis lost two of its NFL teams to cities in the Western United States (Los Angeles and Phoenix). In 2017, the city filed a lawsuit regarding the loss of the Rams, stating issues like the continued payments on the Edward Jones Dome, the breach on contract, and the failure to release financial files. The lawsuit was settled in 2021 for $790 million.

Stan Kroenke became extremely unpopular in St. Louis after the Rams left, with fans often chanting "Kroenke Sucks" or "Fuck Stan Kroenke" at unrelated St. Louis sporting events.

In 2020, St. Louis was one of the cities to receive a football team from the rebranded XFL, dubbed the St. Louis BattleHawks. They played several games in The Dome at America's Center, and notably led the league in fan attendance.

Season Results

Key
The Finish, Wins, Losses, and Ties columns list regular season results and exclude any postseason play. Regular and postseason records are combined only at the bottom of the list.

Seasons

The St. Louis Rams played a total of 336 Regular Season Games and 10 Playoff Games (346 Games)

Notable players

Retired numbers
Numbers of players who played in St. Louis that have been retired by the Rams:

Pro Football Hall of Famers

Pro Bowl selections

See also
 History of the Cleveland Rams
 History of the Los Angeles Rams
 History of the St. Louis Cardinals (NFL)
 St. Louis Gunners
 St. Louis All-Stars

Notes

External links
 stlouisrams.com (2013 archive)

References

Bibliography
 Everson, Linda (1995). St. Louis Rams Facts & Trivia. South Bend: The E.B. Houchin Company. 
 Hession, Joseph (1987). The Rams: Five Decades of Football. San Francisco: Foghorn Press.
 Hunstein, Jim (2000). How 'Bout Them Rams; A Guide to Rams Football History. St. Louis: Palmerston & Reed. 
 LaBlanc, Michael L.; with Ruby, Mary K. (1994). Professional Sports Team Histories: Football. Detroit: Gale Research Inc. 
 Levy, Alan H. (2003). Tackling Jim Crow, Racial Segregation in Professional Football. Jefferson, North Carolina: McFarland and Co., Inc. 
 Littlewood, Thomas B. (1990). Arch: A Promoter, not a Poet: The Story of Arch Ward. Ames, Iowa: Iowa State University Press. 
 Lyons, Robert S. (2010). On Any Given Sunday, A Life of Bert Bell. Philadelphia: Temple University Press. 
 MacCambridge, Michael (2005). America’s Game: The Epic Story of How Pro Football Captured a Nation. New York: Anchor Books 
 McDonough, Will (1994). 75 Seasons: The Complete Story of the National Football League. Atlanta: Turner Publishing, Inc. 
 Peterson, Robert W. (1997). Pigskin: The Early Years of Pro Football. New York: Oxford University Press. 
 Ross, Charles K. (1999). Outside the Lines: African Americans and the Integration of the National Football League. New York: New York Publishing Company. 
 Strode, Woody; with Young, Sam (1990). Goal Dust. Lanham, Maryland: Madison Books. 
 Sullivan, George (1968). Pro Football’s All Time Greats. New York: G. P. Putnam's Sons. p. 23–28.
 Willis, Chris (2010). The Man Who Built the National Football League: Joe F. Carr. Lanham, Maryland: Scarecrow Press, Inc. 

St. Louis Rams
St. Louis Rams